Maurice Keating (February 1690 – 17 November 1769) was an Irish politician.

Keating first stood for Kildare Borough in 1715, but was declared "not duly elected" and the seat was taken by Richard Warren.

He represented Kildare Borough in the Irish House of Commons between 1725 and 1727. He was then elected to sit for Kildare County from 1727 to 1760. From 1761 to 1768 he represented Naas, before again sitting in the Commons for Kildare Borough from 1768 until his death a year later.

References

1690 births
1769 deaths
Irish MPs 1715–1727
Irish MPs 1727–1760
Irish MPs 1761–1768
Irish MPs 1769–1776
Members of the Parliament of Ireland (pre-1801) for County Kildare constituencies